The Roman Catholic Diocese of Kaohsiung (Lat: Dioecesis Kaohsiungensis) is a diocese of the Latin Church of the  Roman Catholic Church in Taiwan.

The diocese has the distinction of being the first Catholic ecclesiastical territory erected on the island of Taiwan. Created as the Apostolic Prefecture of the Island of Formosa in 1913, the name was changed to the Apostolic Prefecture of Kaohsiung in 1949. In 1961, the Prefecture was elevated to a full diocese, and became a suffragan to the Archdiocese of Taipei.

The current bishop is Peter Liu Cheng-chung, appointed in January 2006. In November 2009, he was given the "ad personam" (personal) title of archbishop by Pope Benedict XVI.

Ordinaries
Clemente Fernández, O.P. † (1913 Appointed – 1921 Died)
Thomas de la Hoz, O.P. † (27 Jul 1921 Appointed – 1935 Died)
Joseph Asajiro Satowaki, † (1941 Appointed – 1946)
Joseph Arregui y Yparaguirre, O.P. † (5 Mar 1948 Appointed – 1961 Died)
Joseph Cheng Tien-Siang, O.P. † (21 Mar 1961 Appointed – 19 Aug 1990 Died)
Paul Shan Kuo-hsi, S.J. † (4 Mar 1991 Appointed – 5 Jan 2006 Retired)
Peter Liu Cheng-chung (5 Jan 2006 Succeeded – present)

See also
Catholic Church in Taiwan

1913 establishments in Taiwan
Organizations based in Kaohsiung
Christian organizations established in 1913
Kaohsiung
Roman Catholic dioceses and prelatures established in the 20th century